This is a list of weapons of the Spanish–American War. The Spanish–American War was a conflict in 1898 between Spain and the United States, effectively the result of American intervention in the ongoing Cuban War of Independence.

United States

Offensive weapons

Edged weapons

 Bolo knife (used by Philippine Revolutionary Army)
 Bowie knife (also known as hunter)
 Cutlass
 Krag M1892/98 bayonet
 M1860 light cavalry saber
 Machete (used mostly by Cuban rebels)
 Mameluke sword
 Sabre
 United States Marine Corps noncommissioned officer's sword

Sidearms

 Colt M1871/72 Open Top
 Colt M1873 Single Action Army
 Colt M1877
 Colt M1878
 Colt M1889
 Colt M1892
 Colt M1898 New Service
 Merwin & Hulbert Pocket Army
 Remington M1875
 Remington M1890
 Smith & Wesson No.3
 Smith & Wesson Safety Hammerless

Shotguns

 Coach gun
 Winchester M1887 and M1901
 Winchester M1893 and M1897

Rifles

 Colt-Burgess rifle
 Colt Lightning Carbine
 Lee M1895 Navy
 Remington–Lee M1885
 Remington Rolling Block rifle
 Spanish Mauser M1893 (used by Cuban rebels and Philippine Revolutionary Army)
 Springfield M1873
 Springfield M1884
 Springfield M1888
 Springfield M1892/99
 Winchester Hotchkiss M1876
 Winchester M1873 (used by Cuban rebels)
 Winchester M1886
 Winchester M1892
 Winchester M1894
 Winchester M1895

Explosives and grenades

 Dynamite 
 Ketchum grenade

Machine guns

 Colt–Browning M1895 machine gun
 Gatling machine gun

Artillery

 3.2-inch M1897 field cannon 
 Dynamite gun
 Hotchkiss cannon
 Hotchkiss five barrel revolver cannon

Spain

Offensive weapons

Edged weapons

 M1874 Spanish cavalry spear
 M1875 Spanish officer sabre
 Spanish Mauser M1893 bayonet

Sidearms

 MAS M1892
 Mauser C96
 Mauser Zig-Zag
 Orbea No.7 (Smith & Wesson No.7)
 Smith & Wesson No.3

Shotguns

 Double-barreled shotgun

Rifles

 Remington Rolling Block rifle
 Spanish Mauser M1893

Explosives and grenades

 Dynamite

Machine guns

 Maxim machine gun

Artillery

 Krupp kanone

Defensive weapons

Shields and body armor

 M1881 Spanish cavalry cuirass
 M1881 Spanish cavalry helmet
 Soldado cuera Spanish shield

See also

 List of weapons of the Philippine revolution

Spanish-American War
Spanish-American War
Spanish–American War